Sternitta gabori is a moth of the family Erebidae first described by Michael Fibiger in 2011. It is found in northern India, Pakistan, Afghanistan and north-central Iran.

The wingspan is 8.5–12 mm. The forewing ground colour is unicolorous light grey, but dark grey at the base of the costa and in the upper medial area. The crosslines are brown, including the interveinal dots, which indicate the terminal line. The hindwing ground colour is whitish and the abdomen is white grey.

References

Micronoctuini
Taxa named by Michael Fibiger
Moths described in 2011